Jonathan Hare is a British physicist, science communicator and television presenter. He achieved a first from the University of Surrey, and worked with Harry Kroto at the University of Sussex for his PhD.
While Hare worked in Kroto's group for his PhD he was one of the first people to make and extract C60, Buckminsterfullerene, a football-ball shaped molecule.

Jonathan Hare has worked behind the scenes on a number of television shows, as well as being one of the team of scientists on Rough Science and co-presenting Hollywood Science with Robert Llewellyn.  He worked with the Vega Science Trust, an educational charity set up in 1994 by Sir Harry Kroto with the aim of promoting science via television and the internet. Hare has recorded a set of modules for teachers or as part of internet workshops and has contributed to the GEOSET educational project and created a number of popular science education videos.

He presents about 100 talks and workshops a year both in the UK and abroad. He has written a regular series for the Royal Society of Chemistry as well as published in reviewed journals and in science and electronics magazines, such as Practical Wireless and Elektor. He co-presents workshops at the Brighton Science Festival with the festival's creator Richard Robinson.

Hare is a member of the Institute of Physics (IOP), Royal Society of Chemistry (RSC) and the Radio Society of Great Britain (RSGB). 
In 2000 Jonathan was awarded a NESTA Fellowship, in 2002 awarded an IOP Public Awareness of Physics Award and in 2006 he was made a Fellow of the Royal Society of Chemistry.

Hare (G1EXG) has been a licensed radio amateur since 1984.

Selected publications
Cascode pre-selector for 80m band, J. P. Hare, Practical Wireless, July. 2016
C60 Buckminsterfullerene: Some Inside Stories, Jonathan Hare's Chapter A10 - A PhD student's account of the C60 story 2015 Book edited by Harry Kroto, Pan Stanford Publishing Pte. Ltd. (Hardcover),  (eBook)
Simple analysis of longboard speedometer data, J P Hare, Journal of Physics Education, IOP press, 48 (2013) 723-730.
Special Issue of Chemical Physics Letters - Nobel Prize articles, J P Hare, R Taylor and H W Kroto, Chemical Physics Letters 589 (2013) 56
Simple demonstration to explore the radio waves generated by a mobile phone, J P Hare, Journal of Physics Education, IOP press, 45 (2010) p. 481
Voice on a Sunbeam, J. P. Hare, Journal of Physics Education, IOP press,  (2004) p. 242-246
Preparation and UV / visible Spectra of Fullerenes C60 and C70, J. P. Hare, H. W. Kroto, R. Taylor, Chem. Phys. Lett., 1991, 177, 394-398.
Isolation, Separation and Characterisation of the Fullerenes C60 and C70: The Third Form of Carbon, R. Taylor, J. P. Hare, A. K. Abdul-Sada, H. W. Kroto, J. Chem. Soc., Chemical Communications., 1990, 1423-1425

References

External links 
Online autobiography
The Creative Science Centre
Links to Instructional Mini Films by Jonathan Hare
link to GEOSET site
Jonathans latest news and newsletters

Living people
Year of birth missing (living people)
British physicists
Alumni of the University of Surrey
Alumni of the University of Sussex